Mecloqualone (Nubarene, Casfen) is a Quinazolinone-class GABAergic and is an analogue of methaqualone that was first made in 1960 and marketed mainly in France and some other European countries. It has sedative, hypnotic, and anxiolytic properties caused by its agonist activity at the β subtype of the GABAa receptor, and was used for the treatment of insomnia.  Mecloqualone is faster-acting but shorter-lasting than methaqualone and so was used only as a sleeping pill, in contrast to methaqualone, which was used as a general-purpose anxiolytic as well. Mecloqualone was never as widely used as methaqualone and is no longer prescribed because of concerns about its potential for abuse and overdose. In the United States it is a Schedule I non-narcotic (depressant) controlled substance with an ACSCN of 2572 and 30 g annual aggregate manufacturing quota.

See also 
 Methaqualone 
 Afloqualone
 Etaqualone
 Methylmethaqualone
 Mebroqualone
 Cloroqualone
 Diproqualone
 Gamma-Aminobutyric acid

References 

Sedatives
Chlorobenzenes
Designer drugs
Quinazolinones
GABAA receptor positive allosteric modulators